This is a list of Louisiana Tech Bulldogs baseball seasons. The Louisiana Tech Bulldogs baseball program is a college baseball team that represents Louisiana Tech University in Conference USA in the National Collegiate Athletic Association. Louisiana Tech has played their home games at J. C. Love Field at Pat Patterson Park in Ruston, Louisiana since 1971. 

The Bulldogs have won 21 conference championships, won 2 conference tournament championships, and have played in the NCAA Division I Baseball Championship 7 times.

Season results

Notes

References

 
Louisiana Tech
Louisiana Tech Bulldogs baseball seasons